J-Novel Club is a publishing company specializing in the translation of Japanese light novels into English. It streams light novels and manga in regular installments before publishing finalized e-books. As of August 2021, J-Novel Club has licensed over 150 light novel and manga series and have published more than 800 e-books. It has licensed titles from many Japanese publishers, including Hobby Japan, Overlap, Kodansha, Drecom, Earth Star Entertainment, Kadokawa Corporation, Micro Magazine, Shufunotomo, and Softbank Creative. It was acquired by Kadokawa Corporation on April 28, 2021.

History 
After coming to the conclusion that "there was a whole universe of content out there in Japan that's hardly available in the west at all," Sam Pinansky began working on the business model for J-Novel Club in 2015 and "took inspiration from what the fans had started to do on their own, as well as the more traditional models for book publishing." J-Novel Club's overall purpose was "to create and grow a worldwide market for Japanese light novels translated into English." The original name for the project was "K-Novel" because "kei" is Japanese for "light" (as in the K from K-On!), but before launch the "K" was changed to "J" (for Japanese) to avoid confusion with Korean novels. "Club" was added when it was noticed that the .club top-level domain name was available.

J-Novel Club was founded in 2016 by Sam Pinansky and announced they would release light novels in weekly installments for their members before releasing the finalized books on e-book format. It launched with the titles Occultic;Nine, Brave Chronicle: The Ruinmaker, My Big Sister Lives in a Fantasy World, and My Little Sister Can Read Kanji. Shortly after they announced two more light novels: Grimgar of Fantasy and Ash and I Saved Too Many Girls and Caused the Apocalypse.

On January 19, 2017, J-Novel Club announced it would be collaborating with manga and light novel localization company Seven Seas Entertainment, who would publish print editions of two of J-Novel Club's light novels: Grimgar of Fantasy and Ash and Occultic;Nine. On July 3, 2017, Seven Seas announced they would be publishing print editions of two more J-Novel Club light novels: Arifureta: From Commonplace to World's Strongest and Clockwork Planet.

On July 5, 2018, J-Novel Club announced it would be printing physical versions of some of its light novel series. After launching its print line with In Another World With My Smartphone, as of August 2021, J-Novel Club has 25 light novel and manga series in print.

On November 20, 2018, J-Novel Club launched an online manga reader with five launch titles: A Very Fairy Apartment, Seirei Gensouki: Spirit Chronicles, Infinite Dendrogram, How a Realist Hero Rebuilt the Kingdom, and Ascendance of a Bookworm.

On October 7, 2019, J-Novel Club launched a Kickstarter project for Invaders of the Rokujouma!? print edition and successfully funded it with more than $100,000 over its initial goal.

On November 16, 2019, J-Novel Club announced the new J-Novel Heart imprint focusing on shojo titles.

On April 2, 2021, the J-Novel Pulp imprint was announced with the titles John Sinclair: Demon Hunter, Jessica Bannister, and Perry Rhodan NEO. This imprint focuses on translating and publishing German-language pulp fiction into English.

On April 28, 2021, Kadokawa Corporation announced they acquired the company.

During their panel at Anime NYC 2022, J-Novel Club announced a new collaboration with Yen Press to publish their titles in print. The titles announced for a print release were Hell Mode light novel, The Misfit of Demon King Academy light novel, and the My Instant Death Ability Is So Overpowered, No One in This Other World Stands a Chance Against Me! light novel and manga adaptation. J-Novel Club also announced that it is partnering with RBMedia and Podium to produce audiobook versions of their titles.

Titles

Audiobook titles 
Arifureta: From Commonplace to World's Strongest
Black Summoner
By the Grace of the Gods
The Faraway Paladin
Hell Mode
How a Realist Hero Rebuilt the Kingdom
In Another World with My Smartphone
Min-Maxing My TRPG Build in Another World
My Daughter Left the Nest and Returned an S-Rank Adventurer
Reborn to Master the Blade: From Hero-King to Extraordinary Squire

Manga titles 
Animeta!
An Archdemon's Dilemma: How to Love Your Elf Bride
Ascendance of a Bookworm
Bibliophile Princess
Campfire Cooking in Another World with My Absurd Skill
Campfire Cooking in Another World with My Absurd Skill: Sui's Great Adventure
A Cave King's Road to Paradise: Climbing to the Top with My Almighty Mining Skills!
Cooking with Wild Game
The Coppersmith's Bride
Demon Lord, Retry!
Der Werwolf: The Annals of Veight -Origins-
Did I Seriously Just Get Reincarnated as My Gag Character?!
Discommunication
Doll-Kara
Dragon Daddy Diaries: A Girl Grows to Greatness
The Emperor's Lady-in-Waiting Is Wanted as a Bride
Endo and Kobayashi Live! The Latest on Tsundere Villainess Lieselotte
The Faraway Paladin
Fushi no Kami: Rebuilding Civilization Starts with a Village
Gushing over Magical Girls
Housekeeping Mage from Another World: Making Your Adventures Feel Like Home!
How a Realist Hero Rebuilt the Kingdom
I Love Yuri and I Got Bodyswapped With a Fujoshi!
I Parry Everything: What Do You Mean I'm the Strongest? I'm Not Even an Adventurer Yet!
I Shall Survive Using Potions!
I'm Capped at Level 1?! Thus Begins My Journey to Become the World's Strongest Badass!
Infinite Dendrogram
Isekai Tensei: Recruited to Another World
Karate Master Isekai
Lady Rose Just Wants to Be a Commoner
The Magic in this Other World is Too Far Behind!
Mapping: The Trash-Tier Skill That Got Me Into a Top-Tier Party
Marginal Operation
The Master of Ragnarok & Blesser of Einherjar
My Instant Death Ability Is So Overpowered, No One in This Other World Stands a Chance Against Me! —AΩ—
Now I'm a Demon Lord! Happily Ever After with Monster Girls in My Dungeon
Oversummoned, Overpowered, and Over It!
Peddler in Another World: I Can Go Back to My World Whenever I Want!
Reborn to Master the Blade: From Hero-King to Extraordinary Squire
Rebuild World
Record of Wortenia War
The Saga of Lioncourt
Seirei Gensouki: Spirit Chronicles
The Skull Dragon's Precious Daughter
Sometimes Even Reality Is a Lie!
Sorcerous Stabber Orphen: Reckless Journey
Sorcerous Stabber Orphen: The Youthful Journey
Sweet Reincarnation
The Tales of Marielle Clarac
Tearmoon Empire
The Unwanted Undead Adventurer
A Very Fairy Apartment
Villainess: Reloaded! ~Blowing Away Bad Ends with Modern Weapons~
Welcome to Japan, Ms. Elf!
The Wind That Reaches the Ends of the World
Young Lady Albert Is Courting Disaster

References

External links 
 

Book publishing companies based in Texas
Publishing companies of the United States
Ebook suppliers
Light novels
Kadokawa Corporation subsidiaries
Manga distributors
2021 mergers and acquisitions
Internet properties established in 2016
American subsidiaries of foreign companies
American companies established in 2016
Publishing companies established in 2016
Companies based in San Antonio